Willie Bishop is a New Zealand rugby footballer who played for the Australian rugby union sevens team.

Playing career
Bishop initially played touch rugby and rugby league and in 2000 he won the New Zealand Junior Sportsperson of the Year and New Zealand Maori Sportsperson of the Year awards. In 2002, while playing for the Hibiscus Coast Raiders, won the Auckland Rugby League's Best and Fairest award.

In 2003 he played for the New Zealand Warriors at the Rugby League World Sevens where he was subsequently signed by the Sydney Roosters. He again played in the 2004 World Sevens for the Roosters.

In 2006 he signed with the Manly Sea Eagles, playing six matches in the NSWRL Premier League and also playing for the Belrose Eagles in the 2007 Jim Beam Cup.

Bishop then switched to rugby union, joining the Warringah Rugby Club. In 2008 he was spotted playing rugby union sevens for the club and called into the Australian team. He again played for Australia in 2009.

Personal life
His father Matt played rugby union for New Zealand Maori and his brother Raymond played for Waikato in the NPC.

References

Living people
New Zealand rugby league players
Hibiscus Coast Raiders players
Rugby league halfbacks
New Zealand rugby union players
Male rugby sevens players
Australia international rugby sevens players
Touch footballers
New Zealand sportsmen
Year of birth missing (living people)
People educated at Forest View High School, Tokoroa